A high school or secondary school is a formal learning institution.

High School or high school may also refer to:

High school (North America), covering ages 14–18 (level 3 of the ISCED scale) in the K-12 system

Film and television
 High School (1940 film), an American film
 High School (1954 film), an Italian film
 High School (1968 film), a documentary
 High Schools (film), a 1984 documentary
 High School High (1996), a comedy starring Jon Lovitz and Mehki Phifer
 High School Musical, a 2006 made-for-TV film
 High School Musical (franchise), a media franchise
 High School Musical 2, 2007 sequel to High School Musical
 High School Musical 3: Senior Year, 2008 theatrical sequel to High School Musical
 High School Musical: The Musical: The Series, a 2019-present Disney+ series
 High School DxD a 2008 light novel and anime
 High School (2010 film), a comedy film
 High School (British TV series), a 2012 British television documentary series
 High School (American TV series), a 2022 American streaming television series

Music

Albums
High School, a 1981 album by Sharon Cuneta

Songs
 "High School", a 1970 song by MC5 from Back in the USA
 "High School", a 1978 song by High Inergy from "We Are the Future"
 "High School", a 1980 song by Little Murders

 "High School" (song), a 2013 song by Nicki Minaj, recorded in 2012, released in 2013
 "High School", a 2017 song by Kelsea Ballerini from Unapologetically

Other uses
 Classical dressage also called High School Dressage, the purest form of classical horse riding and dressage
 "High School", a 1975 comedy monologue by Jimmie Walker
 "Highschool", a Strong Bad email from the Homestar Runner website, drawn from the 1983 arcade game Tag Team Wrestling
 High School, a 2003 manhwa series by Kim Young Ho
 High School (book), a 2019 memoir by Sara and Tegan Quin

See also
Fachhochschule
Folk high school, institutions of adult and continuing education common in the Nordic countries and Germany
The High School (disambiguation)
Hochschule
Vocational university